Amy Matysio is a Canadian theatre, television and film actress.

Early life and education
Matysion was born in Regina, Saskatchewan. She holds a Bachelor of Fine Arts in Theatre (Performance) from the University of Regina and has also studied at York St John University in York, England.

Career
Matysio has appeared at several improvisational theatre festivals across Canada, and is a member of General Fools Improvisational Theatre. She has starred in the romantic comedy film Just Friends, the crime thriller Dolan's Cadillac, the psychological thriller Chained, and the comedy horror film Wolf Cop.

She received a Canadian Screen Award nomination for Best Actress in a Drama Program or Limited Series at the 7th Canadian Screen Awards in 2019 for her performance in Save Me.

Stage
HONK! (Globe Theatre)
Loud & Queer (Globe Theatre)
On the Line (Globe Theatre)
Over (As-Q Theater Collective)
The Shape of Things (Theatre Ecstasis)
Measure for Measure (Shakespeare on the Saskatchewan)
Hamlet (Shakespeare on the Saskatchewan)
The Merry Wives of Windsor (Shakespeare on the Saskatchewan)
Love's Labor's Lost (Shakespeare on the Saskatchewan)
Pageant (On the Verge, National Arts Centre, Saskatchewan Playwrights Center, Hot House Theatre).
Just So (Globe Theatre)

Film and television
Just Friends as Darla
The Tommy Douglas Story
The Risen
I Accuse
I'll be Seeing You
The Unsaid
Television series Corner Gas
Incredible Story Studio and renegadepress.com.
Vampire Dog (2012)
Chained (2012)
Stranded (2013)
Lawrence & Holloman (2013)
WolfCop (2014)
Guilt Free Zone (2015-2019)
Another WolfCop (filmed 2016, release 2017)
Save Me (2017)
 Mysticons (2017-2018) as Mallory 
SuperGrid (2018)
Running With Violet season 2 (2019)

Notes

External links

Canadian film actresses
Canadian stage actresses
Canadian television actresses
Living people
Actresses from Regina, Saskatchewan
Year of birth missing (living people)
Alumni of York St John University
Place of birth missing (living people)
20th-century Canadian actresses
21st-century Canadian actresses